{{DISPLAYTITLE:C17H22N2O4}}
The molecular formula C17H22N2O4 (molar mass: 318.368 g/mol) may refer to:

 Imiprothrin
 N-Phenylacetyl--prolylglycine ethyl ester

Molecular formulas